Sayreville Public Schools is a comprehensive community public school district that serves students from kindergarten to twelfth grade from Sayreville, in Middlesex County, New Jersey, United States.

As of the 2020–21 school year, the district, comprised of eight schools, had an enrollment of 6,285 students and 527.6 classroom teachers (on an FTE basis), for a student–teacher ratio of 11.9:1.

The district is classified by the New Jersey Department of Education as being in District Factor Group "DE", the fifth-highest of eight groupings. District Factor Groups organize districts statewide to allow comparison by common socioeconomic characteristics of the local districts. From lowest socioeconomic status to highest, the categories are A, B, CD, DE, FG, GH, I and J.

Schools
Schools in the district (with 2020–21 enrollment data from the National Center for Education Statistics) are:

Elementary schools
Cheesequake School with 225 students in grade PreK
April Magistro, Principal
Emma L. Arleth Elementary School with 453 students in grades K-3
Robert Preston, Principal
Dwight D. Eisenhower Elementary School with 489 students in grades K-3
Scott Nurnberger, Principal 
Harry S. Truman Elementary School with 453 students in grades K-3
Amy Stueber, Principal 
Woodrow Wilson Elementary School with 306 students in grades K-3
Timothy Byrne, Principal
Samsel Upper Elementary School with 989 students in grades 4-5
Stacy Coglianese,Principal
Middle school
Sayreville Middle School with 1,386 students in grades 6-8
Richard Gluchowski, Principal
High school
Sayreville War Memorial High School with 1,755 students in grades 9-12
Richard Gluchowski, Principal
Special education
Jesse Selover Preschool offers a half-day program for children ages 3 to 5 years with mild to moderate disabilities, and a full-day program for children of the same age with moderate disabilities who require a greater degree of time and attention.
Nina Obryk, Principal

Administration
Core members of the district's administration are:
Richard Labbe, Superintendent
Erin Hill, Business Administrator / Board Secretary

Board of education
The district's board of education is comprised of nine members who set policy and oversee the fiscal and educational operation of the district through its administration. As a Type II school district, the board's trustees are elected directly by voters to serve three-year terms of office on a staggered basis, with three seats up for election each year held (since 2013) as part of the November general election. The board appoints a superintendent to oversee the district's day-to-day operations and a business administrator to supervise the business functions of the district.

References

External links
Sayreville Public Schools website
 
School Data for the Sayreville Public Schools, National Center for Education Statistics

Sayreville, New Jersey
New Jersey District Factor Group DE
School districts in Middlesex County, New Jersey